Calatayud station is a railway station located in the Spanish city of Calatayud in Aragon. It brings together the classic Iberian gauge route between Madrid and Barcelona and the new high speed line. For the arrival of the latter, it was decided to remodel the old station known as Calatayud-Jalon. It is served by the AVE high speed trains between Madrid and Barcelona and onwards to Figueres.

References 

Railway stations in Spain
Madrid–Barcelona high-speed rail line